The 1832 United States presidential election in Kentucky took place between November 2 and December 5, 1832, as part of the 1832 United States presidential election. Voters chose 15 representatives, or electors to the Electoral College, who voted for President and Vice President.

Kentucky voted for the National Republican candidate, Henry Clay, over the Democratic Party candidate, Andrew Jackson. Clay won Kentucky by a margin of 8.98%. His victory was likely influenced by the home state advantage he received from his native state.

Results

References

Kentucky
1832
1832 Kentucky elections